Granite Tower, formerly Stellar Plaza and Plaza Tower, is located in the Downtown Denver, Colorado, at 1099 18th Street, Denver, CO. 80202.  This office tower is part of Denver Place, a two city block mixed-use high-rise complex.

See also
List of tallest buildings in Denver

References

Skyscraper office buildings in Denver
Office buildings completed in 1983